St. Joseph's School Imphal is a religious minority educational institution established by the Catholic Church under the Roman Catholic Archdiocess of Imphal.

History 
The school was founded and established in 1983 by a Roman Catholic Priest, Fr. Mathew Planthottam.

Present 
This school is located in Sangaiparou, Imphal, Manipur. It is a school for boys only.

Students from the school are called "Josephians" or "Josephites". It is a Roman Catholic School run by Roman Catholic Archdiocese of Imphal. The School has separate buildings for high school and higher secondary school on the same campus but High school is only for boys and higher secondary school is for co-education.

See also 
List of Schools in India
List of Christian Schools in India

References

Boys' schools in India
Catholic schools in India
Primary schools in India
High schools and secondary schools in Manipur
Educational institutions established in 1983
1983 establishments in Manipur